István Timár-Geng (7 January 1940 – 4 December 1994) was a Hungarian sprint canoer who competed from the mid-1960s to the early 1970s. At the 1968 Summer Olympics in Mexico City, he won two medals with a silver in the K-2 1000 m and a bronze in the K-4 1000 m events.

Timár-Geng also won four medals at the ICF Canoe Sprint World Championships with two gold (K-2 10000 m and K-4 10000 m: both 1963), a silver (K-4 10000 m: 1971), and a bronze (K-4 1000 m: 1970).

References

External links
 
 

1940 births
1994 deaths
Canoeists at the 1968 Summer Olympics
Hungarian male canoeists
Olympic canoeists of Hungary
Olympic silver medalists for Hungary
Olympic bronze medalists for Hungary
Olympic medalists in canoeing
ICF Canoe Sprint World Championships medalists in kayak
Medalists at the 1968 Summer Olympics
20th-century Hungarian people